Cihangirzade İbrahim Bey (1874–1948), known as İbrahim Aydın after the 1934 Surname Law in Turkey, although he is more commonly called under the name he was known prior to the law) was an Azerbaijani-Turkish military officer, statesman, and administrator who served the Ottoman Empire and after its defeat in World War I, became the leader of the Turkish revolutionaries in his native Kars and in southwest Caucasia. After the Armistice of Mudros, he led the First Congress of Ardahan, establishing a local administration, and was later declared the head of the Southwest Caucasian National Resistance Government on 5 November 1918. This movement took control of the cities of Kars, Ardahan, and Batum in late 1918.

In the Second Congress of Ardahan, held between 7 and 9 January 1919, Cihangirzade Ibrahim Bey was elected as the First President of the Provisional National Government of the Southwestern Caucasus.

Cihangirzade worked for the recognition of the republic and the independence of its territory. On 13 April 1919, the capital of the republic, Kars, was occupied by the British troops under the command of General William M. Thomson and after a period of local resistance he was arrested by the British forces and sent, through Batum and İstanbul, to a one-year exile in Malta (see Malta exiles) together with 11 members of his cabinet.

After his return from Malta, he served as mayor of Kars between 1921 and 1927. He died in 1948.

A cenotaph to his memory was erected in Kars in 2003 and a municipal park in the city carries his name.

See also
 Provisional National Government of the Southwestern Caucasus

1874 births
1948 deaths
People from Kars
Ottoman Army officers
Ottoman military personnel of World War I
Malta exiles
Members of Kuva-yi Milliye
Mayors of places in Turkey